Vanamadevi  is a revenue village in Cuddalore district, state of Tamil Nadu, India.

External links 
 Official website of Cuddalore District
 Official website of Tamilnadu
 Government of Tamilnadu

References 

Villages in Cuddalore district
Cities and villages in Cuddalore taluk